The Buffalo Silents of Buffalo, New York were a 1920s exhibition basketball team whose members were deaf and/or mute.  The team barnstormed across Pennsylvania, New York and Ohio, playing teams such as Jim Thorpe and His World-Famous Indians basketball team.

References

Sports in Buffalo, New York
Basketball teams in New York (state)
Deaf basketball players
Defunct basketball teams in the United States
American disabled sportspeople
American deaf people